Nadodi Pattukkaran is a 1992 Indian Tamil-language romantic drama film directed by N. K. Viswanathan. The film stars Karthik and Mohini. The film, scripted and produced by Sangili Murugan, was released on 15 May 1992.

Plot

Sundaram, Thevar Ayya, Periya Madurai, Seedan, Vadivelu and Annamalai form a music group. Sundaram is a jobless graduate who prefers making his living by singing than being unemployed. The group travel from village to village leaving their family. One day, the group enters a village where the robbers spread terror among the villagers. The group confront them and the police arrests the robbers. The group becomes quickly popular. Geetha, the daughter of the village head Sivathaya, falls under the spell of Sundaram. Later, Geetha and Sundaram fall in love with each other, on the other side Geetha's family objects their love. What transpires later forms the crux of the story.

Cast

Karthik as Sundaram
Mohini as Geetha
Jaishankar as Sivathaya
M. N. Nambiar as Thevar Ayya
S. S. Chandran as Sakkarai
Rocky as Periya Pandi
Senthil as Uyaram
Vivek
Charle as Seedan
Chinni Jayanth as Vadivelu
Thyagu as Periya Madurai
Manangatti Subramaniam as Annamalai
Senthamarai as DSP
V. Gopalakrishnan
Peeli Sivam
O. A. K. Sundar as Chinna Pandi
Karuppu Subbiah as Suna Pana
Kullamani
Master Kannan
Master Arun
Ganthimathi as Chella Thayi
Y. Vijaya as Vadivu
S. N. Parvathy 
Annapoorna as Sundaram's mother
Vijaya Chandrika
Thalapathy Dinesh

Soundtrack

The music was composed by Ilaiyaraaja, with lyrics written by Vaali, Muthulingam, Gangai Amaran, Na. Kamarasan, Piraisoodan and Parinaman.

Reception 
N. Krishnaswamy of The New Indian Express said "Ilayaraja has a few melodious numbers in this film, that sees Karthik emoting well. Directed and photographed by N. K. Viswanathan, the film is one that has possibilities that are wasted because of his preference for the pedestrian".

References

External links

1992 films
Films scored by Ilaiyaraaja
1990s Tamil-language films
Indian romantic drama films
Films directed by N. K. Vishwanathan
1992 romantic drama films